Mangwaki is a village in Gurgaon district in the Indian state of Haryana dominated by yadav caste . It is 26.9 km from Rewari Drive via NH 71.

See also 
 Jatauli-Hailey Mandi
 Manesar
 Gurgaon
 Rewari
 Dharuhera
 Nawab of Pataudi
 Pinangwan
 Faridpur
 HeraHeri
 Mangwaki (Noorgarh)

References 

Villages in Gurgaon district